Taktouka (Arabic: تكتوكة) is a traditional Moroccan savory dish and spread made from tomatoes, bell peppers, garlic, toasted paprika and olive oil. Taktouka is an extremely popular dish and can be found in many restaurant in different parts of Morocco.

Overview
The word taktouka derives from the Arabic verb taktak meaning to grind. Taktouka is typically made from tomatoes, bell peppers, paprika, garlic, and various spices. It can be prepared by grinding all the ingredients together, or by cutting them in small pieces and usually takes 45 minutes to prepare the dish.

Taktouka is consumed during all seasons of the year. It is prepared in a form of a mezze, together with other dishes. A side dish, it can be served semi-warm or cold, and is typically eaten with bread.

preparation 

 Step 1  Heat the olive oil, when warm then add the chopped tomatoes, garlic, parsley, cilantro, paprika, cumin, salt, sugar and 2 tablespoons of water.
 Step 2  Stir the ingredients together, cover the pan and cook over medium-low heat for about 15 minutes or until the tomatoes begin to soften. Stir occasionally to make sure they don’t stick to the bottom of the pan.
 Step 3  While the tomatoes cook, make the lime-parsley oil, if using: Combine the olive oil, lime zest and juice, granulated garlic, dried parsley, sugar and salt in a small bowl, stirring until the sugar is dissolved. Set aside until ready to serve.
 Step 4  Uncover the pan and add the chopped peppers, and cover again until the peppers are just cooked, about 10 minutes. (They should hold their shape and have a light crunch). Taste the taktouka and add more salt if necessary.

See also
 Chermoula
 Mezze
 Tajine
 Couscous
 Bastilla
 Shakshouka

References

Salads
Moroccan cuisine
African cuisine
Arab cuisine